Horst Bollmann (11 February 1925 – 7 July 2014) was a German film and television actor. He was born in Dessau.

Filmography

References

External links

Short Biography 

1925 births
2014 deaths
German male television actors
German male film actors
20th-century German male actors